Long Harbour–Mount Arlington Heights is a town in the Canadian province of Newfoundland and Labrador. The town had a population of 185 in the Canada 2021 Census.

The town is the site of the Long Harbour Nickel Processing Plant.

Demographics 

See also
 List of cities and towns in Newfoundland and Labrador

References

Populated coastal places in Canada
Towns in Newfoundland and Labrador